The George Beto Unit (B) is a men's maximum security prison of the Texas Department of Criminal Justice located in unincorporated Anderson County, Texas, US. The prison, co-located with Coffield Unit, Michael Unit, and Powledge Unit prisons and the Gurney Unit transfer facility, has  of land. The unit currently houses over 3,400 offenders.

The unit opened in June 1980. It has the Correctional Institutions Division Region II Maintenance headquarters. The unit was named after George Beto, who served as prison director from 1962 to 1972. In 2008 Perryn Keys of the Beaumont Enterprise said that Beto "has been described as a gladiator’s playground — a hardcore joint, even as prisons go." That year, Ricardo Ainslie, an author and a professor in the educational psychology department of the University of Texas, said that when he toured Beto with the warden, he was "scared (expletive)." Joyce King, author of the 2002 book Hate Crime: The Story of a Dragging in Jasper, Texas, said that Beto's reputation as a "gladiator" prison stems from the fact that most of its prisoners are in their mid-20s, relatively young. As of that year, some inmates are at the equivalent of a 4th year high school student (senior), and a few are near their 30s. King also said "The dubious distinction is also a warning—gladiators either fight because they must or because they like to."

History

In 2014 Curtis Garland, Jr., a prisoner from Dallas who began a 12-year sentence for family violence in 2012, died of an asthma attack. His family believed that prison officials did not disclose the true details related to the death.

Facility
Beto has housing for its warden. The warden housing, in one duplex unit, is a part of three duplexes. One other duplex has housing for the warden of another unit, and one is unoccupied as of 2002.

The prison places its confirmed gang members in the F Wing. The far southern wing, PTRC, is a pre-release wing.

The prison currently has three unoccupied wings that are kept for emergency overflow. The three wings are old administrative segregation wings from when the unit housed MROP offenders. Currently, the only occupied wings are A, B, C, D, E, G, H, I, J, K, L, M, N, P, T, U, O (transient wing), X (PHD, Seg, solitary wing).

Custody levels

 General Population: G1 - G4
 Administrative Segregation
 Transient
 Outside
 Trusty

Notable inmates
 Lawrence Russell Brewer: murderer of James Byrd, Jr., executed in 2011.
 John William "Bill" King: murderer of James Byrd, Jr., executed in 2019.
 David Brooks: accomplice of Houston child murderer Dean Corll.

References

External links

 Beto Unit Texas Department of Criminal Justice.
 List of prisoners in the Beto Unit - The Texas Tribune

Prisons in Anderson County, Texas
1980 establishments in Texas